Rade (Rhade;;  or ) is an Austronesian language of southern Vietnam. There may be some speakers in Cambodia. It is a member of the Chamic subgroup, and is closely related to the Cham language of central Vietnam.

Dialects
Đoàn Văn Phúc (1998:24) lists nine dialects of Rade. They are spoken mostly in Đắk Lắk Province in the Central Highlands region of Vietnam.

Kpă: spoken throughout Buôn Ma Thuột
Krung: spoken in Ea H'leo and Krông Năng; some Krung also live among the Jarai in Gia Lai Province
Adham: spoken in Krông Buk, Krông Năng, and Ea H'leo
Ktul: spoken in Krông Bông and the southern part of Krông Pắk
Drao (Kơdrao): spoken in M'Đrăk (in the townships of Krông Jing, Cư M'Ta, and Ea Trang)
Blô: spoken in M'Đrăk (small population)
Êpan: spoken in M'Đrăk (small population)
Mdhur: spoken in Ea Kar and M'Đrăk; also in Gia Lai Province and Phu Yen Province
Bih: spoken in Krông Ana and in the southern part of Buôn Ma Thuột

Bih, which has about 1,000 speakers, may be a separate language. Tam Nguyen (2015) reported that there are only 10 speakers of Bih out of an ethnic population of about 400 people.

A patrilineal Rade subgroup known as the Hmok or Hmok Pai is found in the Buôn Ma Thuột area (Phạm 2005:212).

Classification
Đoàn Văn Phúc (1998:23) provides the following classification for the Rade dialects. Đoàn (1998) also provides a 1,000-word vocabulary list for all of the nine Rade dialects.
Area 1
Area 1.1: Krung, Kpă, Adham
Area 1.2: Drao. Êpan, Ktul
Blô (mixture of areas 1.1 and 1.2, as well as Mdhur)
Area 2
Mdhur
Bih

Đoàn Văn Phúc (1998:23) assigns the following cognacy percentages for comparisons between Kpă and the other eight dialects of Rade, with Bih as the most divergent dialect.
Kpă – Krung: 85.5%
Kpă – Adham: 82%
Kpă – Ktul: 82%
Kpă – Mdhur: 80%
Kpă – Blô: 82%
Kpă – Êpan: 85%
Kpă – Drao: 81%
Kpă – Bih: 73%

Vocabulary 
 –  the most senior in age and authority
 – Protestant of Christian (single word identity of E-de)
 – you
 – husband 
 – her/him
 – they 
 – we 
 – love
 – hate
 – younger sibling
 – mom/mother
 – grandma/grandmother
 – grandma/grandfather
 – father, dad daddy 
 – ugly, bad 
 – pretty 
 – beautiful girl 
 – good
 – love 
 – give
 – true
 – go
 – I/me
 – name
 – country
 – want/like
 – God
 – speak
 – language
 – rice porridge
 – fat
 – skinny
 – black
 – to be from
 – from
 – America
 – Cambodia
 – person
 – learn
 – sound of displeasure/pain
 – 
 – type/write
 – English
 – Rade/Ede
 – A lot
 – French

Phonology
The spelling is shown in italics.

Vowels

 Vowels  can also be heard as more centralized-back .

Consonants

  can also be heard as a more bilabial .
 Glottalized final consonant sounds  are heard only in final position.

References

Further reading

External links 
 Alphabet and pronunciation
 ELAR archive of Documenting Bih
 

Chamic languages
Languages of Vietnam